Penicillium striatisporum is an anamorph species of fungus in the genus Penicillium which was isolated from the rhizosphere of chilli peppers.
Penicillium striatisporum has a selective antifungal activity against Candida albicans This species produces striatisporin A, striatisporolide A, calbistrin C, deformylcalbistrin A, citromycetin, citromycin, fulvic acid, (-)-2,3-dihydrocitromycetin and (+)-hexylitaconic acid

References

Further reading 
 
 
 
 
 

striatisporum
Fungi described in 1969